Guémappe is a commune in the Pas-de-Calais department in the Hauts-de-France region of France.

Geography

History
First noted as Gammapium in 1135. The seigneurie belonged to that of the Montmorency family at Wancourt. The village was the scene of heavy fighting in April 1917 and August 1918, during the First World War.

Population

Places of interest
 The church of St. Leger, rebuilt, along with most of the village, after World War I.

See also
Communes of the Pas-de-Calais department

References

Communes of Pas-de-Calais